This is a list of Harlequin Romance novels released in 2006.

Releases

References 

Romance novels
Lists of novels
2006 novels